Dexter Anthony Carter (born September 15, 1967) is a former running back who played for the San Francisco 49ers and the New York Jets in the National Football League. He was drafted in the first round in the 1990 NFL Draft. He played college football at Florida State University.

NFL career
In 1990, Carter was drafted in the 1st round by the 49ers, the winner of the previous 2 Super Bowls, with the hopes of taking some of the running game responsibility from Roger Craig as well as serving as the primary kick returner. He led the team in rushing in his rookie season with 460 yards after Craig missed 5 games with injury. He was the second-leading rusher in 1991 behind Keith Henderson, but then fell on the running back depth chart the following year and became almost exclusively a kick returner after that. In 1996, he was selected as a member of the 50th Anniversary 49er Modern Era All-Time Team.

In that after Super Bowl XXIX, he signed a free agent three-year contract with the Jets.  He struggled on his new team, fumbling 7 times (losing 4) in 10 games before being cut on November 8. He was then picked up by the 49ers and resumed his role as their kick and punt returner the next week. He created NFL history that season by becoming the only player ever to record at least one touch and one all purpose yard in 17 regular season games.  He did this by playing for the Jets before their bye week and being signed by the 49ers after their bye week.

Carter finished his 7 NFL seasons with 1,042 rushing yards and 5 touchdowns, along with 59 receptions for 652 yards and 2 touchdowns. On special teams, he returned 138 punts for 1,358 yards and 2 touchdowns, while also returning 250 kickoffs for 5,412 yards and 2 touchdowns.

Coaching career
In 2007, Dexter returned to Florida State University as the running backs coach for 3 seasons. He was not retained after the 2009 season as incoming head coach Jimbo Fisher brought in his own coaches when taking over for Bobby Bowden.

Personal life
Carter's cousin, Byron Buxton, is a professional baseball player. He was the second overall pick in the MLB draft. Both hail from Baxley Georgia.  His son, Dexter Carter Jr., has drawn comparisons to his father with his speed and natural football ability at the Bolles School in Jacksonville, Florida. Dexter is the Founder and Chairman for Dexter Carter 35 Foundation. dextercarter35foundation.org The mission is Making Hopes and Dreams a Reality for at risk youth experiencing despair, hardship and poverty.

References

External links
 Dexter Carter statistics.
 Florida State Seminoles bio

1967 births
Living people
American football running backs
American football return specialists
Florida State Seminoles football players
San Francisco 49ers players
New York Jets players
Florida State Seminoles football coaches
People from Baxley, Georgia
Players of American football from Georgia (U.S. state)
Florida State Seminoles men's track and field athletes